George Jason may refer to:

George Jason (magician), Magicians Guild of America
George Jason of the Jason Baronets

See also
Jason George, American actor and model